Frances Newton Hospital, also called Mission Hospital, is a hospital in Ferozepur Cantonment. It was established in 1894. The hospital functions under the aegis of the CNI, Diocese of Chandigarh, with Rev. Joel Mall as the Bishop. The hospital is located on station road about 0.5 km from Cantonment railway station and 3.2 km from Cantonment bus stand. The hospital provides nursing care. It is the oldest hospital and teaching institute of North India .

School of Nursing
Frances Newton Hospital School of Nursing offers three and a half years of diploma in General Nursing & Midwifery (G.N.M) course along with one and half years of Auxiliary Nursing and Midwifery (ANM) course, at undergraduate level. The institution came into being in 1921. It has the recognition from Indian Nursing Council (INC), Delhi, Government of Punjab and is affiliated to Punjab Nursing Registration Council (PNRC).

History
The medical missionary work in this sensitive border town was started in the year 1894 by the Presbyterian Church of United States. Rev. Janvier Newton and his wife Mrs. Frances on whom the hospital is named arrived in Firozpur in the year 1877. The same year i.e. 1877 Rev. Janvier had to return to US for health reasons. He took a two years condensed medical course at the Jefferson Medical College, Philadelphia. Although this was not long enough time to get medical degree, it qualified him to do much for the benefit of the sick. In 1882 when he took charge of the Mission work in Firozpur, he opened a small dispensary in Firozpur City and daily treated a number of patients during summer, while in winter he connected medical work with his preaching. He traveled to the surrounding villages on a camel, back carrying his saddle bags of medicines and equipment. He worked mainly among men. Mrs. Frances, Dr. Newton's wife on whom the hospital is named, was much concerned about the women as there was no medical facility for them. She started running a dispensary for women and children from her residence. Later on, her daughter after taking a short medical course in America joined her. It was the mid 1880s that this dispensary from their home started functioning. When she had gone to US for leave and lying on sick bed in the Women's hospital, Philadelphia, Mrs. Frances Newton thought of building a hospital for the women and children of Firozpur area. She started talking about this and praying about it. The result was $2000/- collected to build the hospital for women and children. That was the beginning of Frances Newton Hospital and a 50-bed hospital was finally opened in 1894, and later on School of Nursing was opened in 1923. The first fully trained Missionary doctor that came out to the Frances Newton Hospital, Firozpur was Dr. Maud Allen from California. She was the Medical Superintendent of the hospital for 30 years. She owned a car which was very very rare thing ‘Model-T Ford’. She was an outstanding doctor and liked by all. Dr. Grace Edwards was the next missionary to be the Medical Superintendent for the next six years. She got married and Dr. Dorothy Ferris took charge of the hospital in 1936. Dr. Ferris, a graduate from the University of Cincinnati and a short course at the Columbus College of Physicians and Surgeons in New York, before coming to India. She spent a year in Language schools.

It was in 1947, the year of India's Independence and the time of partition of Punjab that the men patients most of whom were the victims of the communal violence of those days were also admitted to the hospital. It was then that the hospital became a general hospital for women, children and men. The terrible floods of 1947 razed to ground 36 out of the 39 buildings of the buildings. Dr. Ferris discussed about the floods and the damage to the hospital. She said, “Then of course cae the problem? What are we going to do? Are we going to rebuild or not? The hospital was on the border, the centre of conflict between Pakistan and India. Everybody advised us not to build. It was too dangerous place. Every time there is trouble we would be in middle of it, and so we made it a matter of prayer”. She continued, “Lord, where do you want the hospital? Do you want it or is time to close?” Dr. Ferris said that the answer came that “I will establish you after your old estates, and I will do better upto you than at the first, and you will know that I am God.” So on this foundation the new hospital was built. The donations came from the Presbyterian Women's Jubilee Fund. In place of the 85 bed hospital prior to the floods, a 150-bed hospital was built and officially opened in 1953. On the retirement of the last Missionary Medical Superintendent, Dr. Dorothy Ferris and Dr.& Mrs. Bakhshish Masih were contacted in New York and asked to return to India to take over the responsibilities of the hospital from Dr. CY. Satow who had acted as the Medical Superintendent after Dr. Ferris retired. In 1986 Dr. Bakhshish Masih left and went to the States. The responsibility of running Frances Newton Hospital was handed over to Dr. Richard David who was working as Deputy Medical Superintendent and joined with his wife Dr.(Mrs.) Reena David in September 1976. Dr. Richard David worked in Frances Newton Hospital as a Director/Medical Superintendent till 31 July 2014. Dr. Anurag Amin has been appointed as Director Medical Superintendent on 1 August 2014. The Lord has blessed the work started by the American Presbyterian Missionaries in Firozpur and today it is a general hospital of 150 beds.

Infrastructure and Facilities
The hospital contains the following facilities:
4 bedded ICCU, 
13 bedded Medical ICU
10+ bedded Surgical ICU. 
8 bedded ICN with warmer, 
4 bedded Pre-term Nursery, 
3 Operating rooms. 
All these facilities is backed up by nurses, doctors and qualified Anesthesiologist.

See also 
 Nursing in India

References 

Hospitals in Punjab, India
Firozpur
Hospitals established in 1894
1894 establishments in India